Eveliina Mäkinen (born 12 April 1995) is a Finnish ice hockey goaltender and member of the Finnish national team, currently signed with the Metropolitan Riveters of the Premier Hockey Federation (PHF).

Playing career
Mäkinen was born in Kiukainen and began playing ice hockey at the age of four. She started playing with her brother and learned the game at a local ice hockey rink. She played on boys minor ice hockey teams until 2011 when she joined Team Oriflame Kuortane, the women's representative team of the Kuortaneen urheilulukio, in the Jääkiekon naisten SM-sarja (renamed Naisten Liiga in 2017). In the 2012–13 season, her second with Team Oriflame, she posted 3.02 goals against average and a .917 save percentage.

Mäkinen joined the Minnesota Duluth Bulldogs women's ice hockey program in January of the 2014–15 season. She saw action in just one game, as the Bulldogs' starting goaltender, Kayla Black, started 36 of 37 games that season.

Rather than return to the NCAA, Mäkinen opted to remain in Finland for the 2015–16 season and played with Ilves Naiset.

Between 2016 and 2018, she played as the starter for Lukko Naiset in the Naisten Liiga and played with Lukko U20 A in the men's U20 Suomi-sarja. She was recognized as Naisten SM-saija Goaltender of the Year in 2017.

In May 2018, she announced that she was signing with Linköping HC in Sweden, taking over the starting position from the retiring Florence Schelling.

After two seasons with Linköping HC, she left the club to sign with Leksands IF for the 2020–21 SDHL season. In January 2021, she transferred to Brynäs IF and several months later signed a two-year contract with the club through the 2022–23 season.

International career 
Mäkinen played with the Finland women's national under-18 team during the 2013 IIHF World Women's U18 Championship, finishing a 2.77 goals against average and .905 save percentage.

She made her debut on the senior Finland women's national ice hockey team in August 2013 with a 4–1 victory over Japan. She split goaltending for that game with Tiina Ranne, who was also making her debut with the team.

Mäkinen was chosen to play in the 2014 Winter Olympics as the third goaltender, a selection that she said took her by surprise. She was again named to Finland's roster for the 2018 Winter Olympics.

She has represented Finland at the 2015, 2017, and 2019 IIHF Women's World Championship.

Personal life 
On the question of hitting in women's hockey, she has stated that "right now it’s really hard for the refs to differentiate what ‘contact’ means. Maybe there could be room for changes in the rules to allow more body contact without it overtaking the game."

She married former Liiga defenceman Atte Mäkinen in 2021.

References

External links
 
 
 
 

1995 births
Living people
Brynäs IF Dam players
Finnish expatriate ice hockey players in Sweden
Finnish expatriate ice hockey players in the United States
Finnish women's ice hockey goaltenders
Ice hockey players at the 2014 Winter Olympics
Ice hockey players at the 2018 Winter Olympics
Ice hockey players at the 2022 Winter Olympics
Ilves Naiset players
Leksands IF Dam players
Linköping HC Dam players
Lukko Naiset players
Medalists at the 2018 Winter Olympics
Medalists at the 2022 Winter Olympics
Metropolitan Riveters players
Minnesota Duluth Bulldogs women's ice hockey players
Olympic bronze medalists for Finland
Olympic ice hockey players of Finland
Olympic medalists in ice hockey
People from Eura
Sportspeople from Satakunta
Team Kuortane players